Dominik Krieger (born 25 June 1968 in Herrenberg) is a German former professional cyclist. He rode in 2 editions of the Tour de France and one Giro d'Italia.

Major results
1988
1st Stage 7 Tour de l'Avenir
1989
1st Rund um Köln

References

1968 births
Living people
German male cyclists
People from Herrenberg
Sportspeople from Stuttgart (region)
Cyclists from Baden-Württemberg